"Except for Monday" is a song written by Reed Nielsen and recorded by American country music artist Lorrie Morgan. It was released in October 1991 as the third single from her album Something in Red. The song reached number 4 on the Billboard Hot Country Singles & Tracks chart and number 7 on the RPM Country Tracks chart in Canada.

Chart performance

Year-end charts

References

1991 singles
Lorrie Morgan songs
RCA Records singles
Song recordings produced by Richard Landis
Songs written by Reed Nielsen
1991 songs